Anthony Lamar Copeland (born April 14, 1963) is a former American football linebacker in the National Football League for the Washington Redskins.  He played college football at Wichita State University and University of Louisville.

1963 births
Living people
American football linebackers
Players of American football from Atlanta
Washington Redskins players
Wichita State Shockers football players
Louisville Cardinals football players